Dorling may refer to:

Dorling Kindersley, UK-founded international publishing company

People with the surname
Christopher Dorling (retired 1987), co-founder of Dorling Kindersley publishers
Danny Dorling (born 1968), British geographer
George Dorling (1918 – 1987), English footballer
Henry Dorling (died 1873), first clerk of Epsom racecourse, and stepfather of Mrs Beeton
Lionel Dorling (1860 - 1925), British Army officer
Philip Dorling (active 2008 - ), Australian writer
T.J. Dorling, designer of Scorpion (dinghy)